Jiangxi Huaxiang Fuqi Automobile Co.Ltd., previously Fuqi Auto Works or Fuzhou Auto Works, was a manufacturer of automobiles from the People's Republic of China.

History
Fuzhou Auto Works from Fuzhou was founded in 1969. Commercial vehicle production began in the 1970s, and SUV productions followed in the 1980s. In 1989, the first passenger vehicle production appeared, under the Fuqi brand. Some vehicles were exported to the United States. From 2003 to 2004 there was a cooperation with Hebei's Zhongxing Automobile, followed by the name change to Jiangxi Huaxiang Fuqi Automobile Co.Ltd.

According to another source, the Fuqi brand originally belonged to Hebei's Zhongxing Automobile between 2001 and 2004 before the Ningbo Huaxiang Group took over the company.

The last saved version of the company's website is from 2008. The company website is no longer available after 2008.

Jiangling Motors Corporation Group reorganised Jiangxi Huaxiang Fuqi Automobile and established JMCG Light Vehicle Co., Ltd. or Jiangling Group Light Truck (JMCGL) in early 2013 as a Fuzhou-based pickup truck and minivan manufacturer. Fuzhou is one of the six major vehicle manufacturing bases of JMCG outside Nanchang (the others being  Qingyun, Xiaolan, Changbei, Wangcheng and Taiyuan).

Vehicles 

The first 1980s SUV productions were modifications of the Beijing BJ212.

In 1989, a passenger vehicle called the FQ6400 appeared. The FQ6400 was available both as a four-door sedan and as a hatchback with a large tailgate. The bodies were made of plastic and heavily resemble the Daihatsu Charade.

The Huaxiang Fuqi Yuhu FQ6480 was introduced in 1999 and heavily resemble the Toyota Land Cruiser. Another source states that the vehicle was a licensed production. Later in 2002, the successor called the FQ6500 started production which heavily resembles the Toyota Prado.

Car Production 

Additionally, 1328 pick-ups for 2003 and 2846 for the following year have survived.

References

External links 
  

Motor vehicle manufacturers of China
Companies based in Jiangxi
Vehicle manufacturing companies established in 1969